Sooper Yooper is a series of children's books created by writer Mark Newman and artist Mark Heckman. The books chronicle the work of environmental superhero Billy Cooper, who defends the Great Lakes from invasive species from his headquarters in the Upper Peninsula of Michigan where residents are called Yoopers (derived from "U.P.-ers").

History 
Mark Heckman and Mark Newman met while working on a regional sports magazine in 1988. With a shared perspective of the world at large, the pair joined forces on a variety of projects, mostly billboards with social or environmental themes, during their 22-year creative partnership before Heckman's death in 2010. Racism, AIDS, homelessness, pollution and a number of water-related issues were among the topics addressed in their art-based works.

Examples of their efforts include "Afro Country Club", a billboard for a fictitious all-black country club to highlight racism; and "The Bum Rap", a billboard which employed rap lyrics to call attention to the plight of the homeless. Heckman's AIDS billboard used 2,001 condoms dipped in paint to create greater awareness of the acquired immune deficiency syndrome.

After talking a number of years about writing a children's book together, the two men collaborated on Sooper Yooper: Environmental Defender, published by Thunder Bay Press and the Wege Foundation. In 2012, Newman wrote and illustrated its sequel, Sooper Yooper: The Quest of the Blue Crew, published by Green Junction Press and the Wege Foundation. A prequel, Sooper Yooper: H2O, came out in 2018.

Characters and themes 
Billy Cooper is an ex-Navy SEAL, who is determined to do whatever he can about the increasing threats to the Great Lakes he loves. With his sidekick Mighty Mac, an English Bulldog, at his side, Cooper enlists the help of a green-minded philanthropist known as The Wedge to aid him in his efforts to defend the Great Lakes from invasive species and other environmental dangers. Cooper is not a typical crime fighter. The authors chose to give the main character no apparent superpowers in order to underscore their contention that "the average person – not someone endowed with X-ray vision or superhuman strength – can make a difference and help safeguard the planet." The Blue Crew is composed of super scientists based on the work of real-life biologists and invasive species experts, their teamwork emphasizing themes of cooperation and collaboration.

School program 
Since the release of the first book in 2010, Newman has embarked on a lengthy tour of schools in states that border the Great Lakes, including Illinois, Indiana, Michigan, Ohio and Wisconsin as well as the Canadian province of Ontario. Through the first six years of the Sooper Yooper tour, Newman has spoken to 135,875 students at 536 schools. His program includes a number of scientific specimen as examples, including sea lamprey, zebra mussel, Eurasian watermilfoil, rusty crayfish, emerald ash borer and spiny water fleas.

The books
 Super Yooper: Environmental Defender (2010)
 Super Yooper: The Quest of the Blue Crew (2012)

References 

 Finch Hamilton, Terri (November 1, 2010). "Everyday Superheroes: Book By Friends Has Great Lakes Focus." The Grand Rapids Press. p. B1.
 Keller, Reuben P.; Cadotte, Marc W.; Sandiford, Glenn (ed), Invasive Species in a Civilized World (University of Chicago Press: 2014).
 Herrmann, Andrew (September 14, 1991). "Many teed off over billboard message." Chicago Sun-Times. p. 1.
 McNamee, Tom (December 12, 1991). "Billboard raps plight of homeless." Chicago Sun-Times. p. 16.
 Papajohn, George (September 20, 1989). "Artist's technique takes shot at AIDS." Chicago Tribune. Section 2, p. 1.
 Harvey Keagle, Lauri (April 2011). "Michigan's Greenest Superheroes: New book teaches kids about invasive species." Shore Magazine. p. 32.
 Heckman, Mark; Newman, Mark, Sooper Yooper: Environmental Defender (Thunder Bay Press: 2010).
 Newman, Mark, Sooper Yooper: The Quest of the Blue Crew (Green Junction Press: 2012).
 Graves, Michelle (Oct. 24, 2015). "Great Protector: Author tells students of 'Sooper Yooper' fight against invasive species." Manistee News Advocate. p. 1.

External links 
 
 Official 

2010s children's books
Children's fiction books
American picture books
Environmental fiction books
Superhero fiction
Great Lakes